The women's balance beam event at the 2020 Summer Olympics was held on 25 July and 3 August 2021 at the Ariake Gymnastics Centre. Approximately 90 gymnasts from 53 nations (of the 98 total gymnasts) are expected to compete on the balance beam in the qualifying round.

Guan Chenchen and Tang Xijing of China won the gold and silver medals, respectively, both earning their first Olympic medals. Simone Biles of the United States, performing a scaled-down routine, repeated her bronze medal performance from 2016 for her seventh Olympic medal. Biles' 32 combined World and Olympic medals tied her with Larisa Latynina of the Soviet Union as the most decorated female gymnasts of all time. It was Biles' only finals appearance after a week where she withdrew from all other events due to mental health concerns. The defending champion, Sanne Wevers, did not qualify for the event.

The medals for the competition were presented by Anita L. Defrantz, United States; IOC Vice-President, and the medalists' bouquets were presented by Vasily Titov, Russia; FIG Vice-President.

Background 
This was the 19th appearance of the event, after making its debut at the 1952 Summer Olympics. Defending champion Sanne Wevers of the Netherlands did not qualify to the final; she was instead the third reserve. Simone Biles of the United States, the defending bronze medalist, made her only finals appearance of the Olympics following withdrawals from the team final, the individual all-around final, the vault, uneven bars, and floor event finals due to mental health concerns.

Qualification 

A National Olympic Committee (NOC) could enter up to 6 qualified gymnasts: a team of 4 and up to 2 specialists. A total of 98 quota places are allocated to women's gymnastics.

The 12 teams that qualify will be able to send 4 gymnasts in the team competition, for a total of 48 of the 98 quota places. The top three teams at the 2018 World Artistic Gymnastics Championships (the United States, Russia, and China) and the top nine teams (excluding those already qualified) at the 2019 World Artistic Gymnastics Championships (France, Canada, the Netherlands, Great Britain, Italy, Germany, Belgium, Japan, and Spain) earned team qualification places.

The remaining 50 quota places are awarded individually. Each gymnast can only earn one place, except that gymnasts that competed with a team that qualified are eligible to earn a second place through the 2020 All Around World Cup Series. Some of the individual events are open to gymnasts from NOCs with qualified teams, while others are not. These places are filled through various criteria based on the 2019 World Championships, the 2020 FIG Artistic Gymnastics World Cup series, continental championships, a host guarantee, and a Tripartite Commission invitation. 

Each of the 98 qualified gymnasts are eligible for the balance beam competition, but many gymnasts do not compete in each of the apparatus events.

The COVID-19 pandemic delayed many of the events for qualifying for gymnastics. The 2018 and 2019 World Championships were completed on time, but many of the World Cup series events were delayed into 2021.

Competition format 
The top 8 qualifiers in the qualification phase (limit two per NOC) advance to the apparatus final. The finalists performed on the balance beam again. Qualification scores were then ignored, with only final round scores counting.

Schedule 
The competition will be held over two days, 25 July and 3 August. The qualifying round (for all women's gymnastics events) was the first day; the balance beam final is on the third and final day of individual event finals.

Results

Qualifying 

 Reserves
The reserves for the women's balance beam final were:
  – called up after Larisa Iordache's withdrawal 
 
 

Only two gymnasts from each country may advance to the event final. Gymnasts who did not qualify for the final because of the quota, but had high enough scores to do so were:

Final

Fourth- and fifth-place finishers Ellie Black and Sunisa Lee, respectively, finished with identical scores of 13.866. According the FIG's tie-breaking procedure,  Black earned the higher placement due to higher E-score (7.666 vs 7.466).

References 

Women's balance beam
2020
Women's events at the 2020 Summer Olympics